Mojmal al-Tawarikh wa al-Qasas ( "The Collection of Histories and Tales") was a book written in Ghaznavid Persia (in c. 1126).

The book is a chronicle mostly of Persian Kings, and is often cited as a source of reference for historical events of the 12th century and before. It refers to the classical Persian Shahnameh  as the "tree" and all other poems as "branches".

Some authors have claimed the name of the author to be Ibn Shadi Asad abadi (ابن شادی اسدآبادی).
The book was first edited in 1939 by Mohammad-Taqi Bahar in Tehran.

Another book with the same title was written by Fasihuddin Ahmad in 1441.

References

Sources
 
 

12th-century Arabic books
Persian literature